Kal Khvajeh-ye Qeysari (also Romanized as Kal Khvājeh-ye Qeyṣarī) is a village in Rak Rural District, in the Central District of Kohgiluyeh County, Kohgiluyeh and Boyer-Ahmad Province, Iran. As of the 2006 census, its population was 134, in 22 families.

References 

Populated places in Kohgiluyeh County